Stephan Van Dam (born April 2, 1959) is a cartographer, graphic designer and information architect.  He is the president, principal and creative director of New York–based VanDam, Inc.  Van Dam holds several patents in the field of paper engineering and origami map folding.  Twenty-six of his maps are in the permanent Design Collection of the Museum of Modern Art (MoMA).

Van Dam presented Understanding Maps at the original TED (conference) in 2002.

He has received awards for his work from the Industrial Designers Society of America (IDSA), the American Institute of Graphic Arts (AIGA), the editors of ID Magazine.

Notes

References

Further reading
 Mapping New York Black Dog Publishing 
 Steven Heller The Education of  a Design Entrepreneur Allworth Press 
 Nigel Homes The Best in Diagrammatic Graphics Rotovision SA 1993 
 Keizo Matsui Three Dimensional Graphics Rikuyo-sha Publishing, Inc. 
 ALEHOP, Dissenys, Enginys i Remeis Electa

External links
 

1959 births
Living people
American cartographers
American publishers (people)
Information graphic designers
Artists from New York City
Parsons School of Design alumni
School of Visual Arts alumni